Harry B. Blevins (August 22, 1935 – February 19, 2018) was an American politician. He served in the Virginia House of Delegates January 16, 1998 – September 10, 2001 and the Senate of Virginia September 10, 2001 – August 5, 2013, succeeding Randy Forbes in both offices. Blevins was a member of the Republican Party. Blevins died on February 19, 2018.

Notes

External links
 (campaign finance)

1935 births
2018 deaths
Republican Party Virginia state senators
Republican Party members of the Virginia House of Delegates
East Carolina University alumni
University of Virginia alumni
Politicians from Chesapeake, Virginia
People from Avery County, North Carolina
21st-century American politicians